North Sea flood may refer to:

North Sea flood of 1953
North Sea flood of 1962
North Sea flood of 2007

See also
Storm tides of the North Sea
Floods in the Netherlands